Anton Vasilyevich Sosnin (born 27 January 1990) is a Russian former professional football player. He played as central midfielder or left winger.

Club career
He made his Russian Premier League debut for FC Krylia Sovetov Samara on 12 September 2010 in a game against Spartak Nalchik.

Career statistics

External links

References

1990 births
Footballers from Saint Petersburg
Living people
Russian footballers
Russia youth international footballers
Russia under-21 international footballers
Association football midfielders
Russian Premier League players
PFC Krylia Sovetov Samara players
FC Kuban Krasnodar players
FC Dynamo Moscow players
FC Zenit Saint Petersburg players
FC Neftekhimik Nizhnekamsk players